Jacknife is a 1989 American film directed by David Jones and starring Robert De Niro, Ed Harris and Kathy Baker. The film focuses on a small, serious story, with emphasis on characterization and the complex tension between people in a close relationship.  Stephen Metcalfe, upon whose play Strange Snow (1982) the film was based, wrote the screenplay. Harris was nominated for a Golden Globe for his performance.

Plot
Joseph Megessey (known to most as Megs) is a Vietnam war veteran suffering post-Vietnam stress syndrome who is having trouble fitting in with society. He takes on the responsibility of drawing Dave, a fellow veteran who has become an alcoholic, out of his shell by coaxing him to enjoy life again, as well as urging him to face up to some of his darker memories.

Megs finds himself attracted to Dave's meek sister Martha, who lives with Dave and looks after him. This attraction leads to a love affair, much to Dave's disapproval. Dave eventually vents his anger and frustration at a high school prom where Martha is a chaperone being accompanied by Megs. This leads to Dave finally facing his demons and acknowledging Megs and Martha for being there for him. Afterwards, despite initially ending what was a promising romance, Megs returns to Martha.

Cast
 Robert De Niro as Joseph "Megs" Megessey
 Ed Harris as Dave
 Kathy Baker as Martha
 Sloane Shelton as Shirley
 Ivar Brogger as Depot Mechanic
 Michael Arkin as Dispatcher
 Tom Isbell as Bobby 'Red Sox' Buckman
 Kirk Taylor as Helicopter Gunner
 Jordan Lund as Tiny
 Tom Rack as William Green
 Charles S. Dutton as Jake, Veteran Encounter Group Leader (as Charles Dutton)
 Bruce Ramsay as Corridor Student
 Jessalyn Gilsig as His Girlfriend
 George Gerdes as Tony
 Josh Pais as Rick
 Loudon Wainwright III as Ferretti
 Walter Massey as Ed Buckman
 Elizabeth Franz as Pru Buckman

Production
The movie was filmed in Montreal, Quebec, Canada, Meriden, Connecticut, Wallingford, Connecticut, Newington, Connecticut, and New Britain, Connecticut and Newtown, CT.

References

External links
 
 
 
 

1989 films
1989 romantic drama films
Films directed by David Jones
Films set in Connecticut
Vietnam War films
American romantic drama films
Films shot in Connecticut
Films scored by Bruce Broughton
Alliance Atlantis films
1980s English-language films
1980s American films